Malyye Gayny (Kese Gäynä) is a rural locality (a village) in Kozhay-Semyonovsky Selsoviet, Miyakinsky District, Bashkortostan, Russia. The population was 62 as of 2010. There is 1 street.

Geography 
Malyye Gayny is located 28 km northwest of Kirgiz-Miyaki (the district's administrative centre) by road. Aytugan is the nearest rural locality.

References 

Rural localities in Miyakinsky District